Furness College is the fifth college of the Lancaster University. Planning of the college started in 1966 when a 12-person planning committee chaired by Professor Reynolds (founding dean of Furness) was established to design the buildings and faculties of the college. The committee worked for two years and the college was officially opened in 1968. The main college building occupies a central location on the campus, being just to the south of Alexandra Square. The college's latest rejuvenation occurred in the 2011–2012 academic year, which included a substantial redevelopment of the building interior to accommodate both the college and the Faculty of Health and Medicine. The college is named after the Furness area, part of the Duchy of Lancaster and the historic county of Lancashire.

Trevor

Trevor, the college bar was previously named Furness Bar but was renamed following refurbishments in the 1980s after a vote by the members of the college. Trevor specialises in real ale and has appeared in the CAMRA Good Beer Guide.  The bar is also generally the venue for college social events, various campus societies and a wine club which is headed by the college wine steward.

Symbols
The Furness College motto is Everywhere else is nowhere, summing up the social and community reputation of the college.  Following a major branding exercise by the university in 2008, the college's long-standing colours of purple and silver were officially adopted, replacing the often used red, orange, black and white. The logo was also re-drawn in line with the university wide re-branding of the colleges.

Residence blocks 
The college residences are named after villages, houses or fells in the Furness region. The nine original residence blocks were demolished in August 2004 to make way for site redevelopment with much larger ensuite buildings. The original buildings were named Dalton, Colton, Aldingham, Hawkshead, Pennington, Kirkby-Ireleth, Ulverston, Urswick and Lowick. The five houses named Furness Perimeter were constructed in 1992. Furness Central re-used the names of four of the original buildings when the new buildings opened in September 2006. Furness Perimeter are designated as upgraded standard by the university, whilst Furness Central are superior ensuite.

Furness Perimeter: (192 bedspaces)
Greenodd
Bardsea
Brantwood
Torver
Wetherlam

Furness Central: (347 bedspaces)
Aldingham
Colton
Hawkshead
Pennington

Governance

The College Syndicate is the body charged by the charter of the university with the good governance of the college. University Council appoints, on the recommendation of the College Syndicate, the principal of the college.  Other college officers, for example the Senior Tutor and Dean, are elected directly by the Syndicate. The syndicate elects a senior member of college to the University Senate for a three-year term and two members to the University Court for three years, once re-newable. Unusually for a Lancaster college, no members of the JCR are co-opted to the syndicate.

The Furness College Council is responsible for the day-to-day running of the college. It comprises the principal and vice-principal; ten officers of the Senior Common Room who manage the tutorial system, the deanery, the residences, social life and the college office; and fifteen members of the JCR who manage undergraduate affairs. The council meets once each academic term.

Notable alumni
Roger Ashton-Griffiths, Actor, Screenwriter and Director
Alan Campbell, MP for Tynemouth
 David Favis-Mortlock, Environmental Change Institute, University of Oxford
Ralph Ineson, Actor 
Jon Moulton, Founder of Better Capital

References

External links
 College Website 
 Lancaster University Page

Colleges of Lancaster University
Furness College, Lancaster